The guinguette was a popular drinking establishment in the suburbs of Paris and of other cities in France. Guinguettes would also serve as restaurants and often as dance venues. The origin of the term comes from guinguet, indicating a local sour, light white wine. 

The 1750 Dictionnaire de la langue française defined guinguette as a "small cabaret in the suburbs and the surrounds of Paris, where craftsmen drink in the summer and on Sundays and on Festival days. This term is new. It comes apparently from what is sold in these cabarets: a sour light local green wine, that is called ginguet, such as found around Paris." A goguette was a similar kind of establishment.

History
During the 18th century, a consumer revolution led once isolated villages and hamlets outside Paris to be swept up in a booming material culture. Commodities, and particularly alcohol, consumed outside the customs barrier of the city were considerably cheaper, being exempt from state taxes. This encouraged the growth of an entertainment industry just beyond the tax man's reach and a network of drinking establishments was established. They were especially popular on Sundays and holidays, when Parisians would visit to enjoy themselves and to get drunk cheaply. Today, the term 'guinguette' is still used for a waterside refreshment stand, particularly open-air, all over France.

The development of railways in the 1880s and the establishment of the "Gare de la Bastille" (Bastille station) with many trains serving the eastern suburbs of Paris (such as Nogent sur Marne) contributed to the success of guinguettes.

Geography
The majority are on the edges of the Seine and the Marne rivers, and some are in a district that stretches to the outskirts of Rouen. Some guinguettes were however far from the rivers, as the picturesque guinguettes of le Plessis-Robinson built among the chestnut trees. There were hundreds of guinguettes as far away as Nogent-sur-Seine, where the nature of the Seine valley changes most.

Tradition decline and return
Today guinguettes are an object of nostalgia. The guinguettes were marvelous places to return to lighter times during the mad years of the 1920s. They were obviously an eminent subject for painting during the first half of the 20th century.

But television and the ban on bathing in the rivers in the 1960s caused the decline of guinguettes. This ban was justified for reasons of hygiene (water quality deteriorated in the 1960s and 1970s) and safety (the risk due to barge traffic and drowning). In the 1960s, guinguettes became a subject of nostalgia. Many people forgot guinguettes, as the French scriptwriter Michel Audiard had one of his characters point out. Since the 1980s, there has been a small revival, particularly along the Marne river. In 2008, some guinguettes were open every weekend.

As of 2011 a gradual return to modern guinguettes had begun.

See also 

Bal-musette
Café-concert
Eugène Imbert

References

Movies with guinguettes 
 Nogent, Eldorado du dimanche ("Nogent, Sunday Eldorado") - Marcel Carné, 1929
 La belle équipe ("The Fine Crew") - Julien Duvivier, 1936, with Jean Gabin singing the well-known waltz Quand on s'promène au bord de l'eau ("Walking on the River Bank")
 Casque d'or ("Golden Helmet") - Jacques Becker, 1952

External links 
 web site of a guinguette on the Marne river  
 website of the "Culture Guinguette" association  

French culture
Dance venues